Lodore is a rural unincorporated community in northern Amelia County just south of the Appomattox River in the U.S. state of Virginia. It is located along SR 616 (S. Genito Road) at its intersection with the northern terminus of SR 636 (N. Lodore Road).

The community was listed as a post village called Houston before the name was changed to Lodore about 1845. On Civil War-era maps, however, "Lodore" was used only as a reference to the home of one of the landowners along Genito Road; an intersection just under a mile away was noted as Giles Crossroads or Giles Chapel, after William Branch Giles, U.S. senator and governor of Virginia, whose home is a short distance northeast. The Lodore post office remained in operation until at least the turn of the 20th century; the area is now served by the post office several miles south at the county seat, Amelia Court House, ZIP code 23002.

The immediate vicinity of Lodore appears to have been spared significant action during most of the Civil War, although numerous engagements were fought only a few miles to the south and west during the final days of the war in early April 1865, as General Robert E. Lee and his army continued their westward retreat. A Confederate wagon train from Richmond, forced to bypass the Lodore area because the Genito bridge over the Appomattox River was uncrossable, was destroyed by  Union troops near Paineville.

Several structures listed on the National Register of Historic Places are located near Lodore, including:
 The Wigwam, historic residence of William Branch Giles, 24th governor of Virginia, approximately 4 miles northeast.
 Haw Branch plantation house, approximately 2 miles south by straight-line distance. 
 Grub Hill Church, approximately 4 miles southeast.
 Egglestetton plantation house, approximately 4 miles southeast.

References

 

.

Unincorporated communities in Virginia
Unincorporated communities in Amelia County, Virginia